Micrurapteryx bidentata is a moth of the family Gracillariidae. It is known from Kyrgyzstan.

References

Gracillariinae
Moths described in 1992